Antoun is a given name and surname, typically a transliteration of Arabic  (Anṭūn), also spelt Antoon, used by Christian Arabs.  Notable people with the name Antoun include:.

Given name
Antoun Khouri (born 1931), Syrian bishop
Antoun Saadeh (1904 – 1949), Lebanese philosopher, writer and politician
Antoun Sehnaoui (born 1972), Lebanese banker,

Middle name
Dani Antoun Bterrani (born 1972), Kuwaiti businessman

Surname
Gustavo Antoun (born 1957), Argentine footballer
Richard T. Antoun (1932 – 2009), American anthropologist

See also

Antoan
Antoin
Anton (given name)
Anton (surname)
Antoon
Antun
Antun Maqdisi